Ugong may refer to:

Ugong language, an endangered language of Western Thailand, spoken in isolated pocket provinces.
Ugong people a group of ethnic people in Thailand.
Ugong, Pasig, a barangay in Pasig, Metro Manila, Philippines.
Ugong Norte, Quezon City, a barangay in Quezon City, Metro Manila, Philippines.
Ugong, Valenzuela, a barangay in Valenzuela, Metro Manila, Philippines.